Early Bourgeois Revolution in Germany, also known as the Peasants' War Panorama (Bauernkriegspanorama), is a monumental painting by the East German painter Werner Tübke, executed from 1976 to 1987.

Despite being commissioned by the East German government to commemorate the Battle of Frankenhausen, fought on 15 May 1525 during the German Peasants' War, the painting is not a typical battle painting, nor in the style of socialist realism prevalent at the time. Instead, Werner Tübke created an immense allegory of Renaissance society with more than 3000 characters, containing strong fantastical and surreal elements. The artist named German Renaissance painters Albrecht Dürer and Lucas Cranach the Elder as his most important influences; his style is sometimes also considered as magical realism.

Creation
The painting was commissioned in 1976 by the Ministry of Culture of East Germany. It was finished in 1987. The canvas was woven in one piece at the textile factory in Sursk, the Soviet Union, and weighs 1.1 tons. Tübke dedicated 480 workdays to the painting and used a total of 90,000 tubes of paint.

The museum opened to the public on 14 September 1989, in time for the 500th anniversary of the birth of Thomas Müntzer.

References

External links
 
 Panorama Museum

 Cycloramas
1987 paintings
East German culture
German paintings
German Peasants' War
History paintings
Paintings in Thuringia
Thomas Müntzer
War paintings